Joseph Anthony Adame (born October 20, 1945) is former mayor of Corpus Christi, Texas.

He was born to Gumercinda and Cayatanio Adame in Spohn Hospital in Corpus Christi TX.

He graduated from Corpus Christi Academy in 1963, then attended Del Mar College in 1964.  In 1969, he graduated from Sam Houston State with a Bachelor of Business Administration.

In 1970 he became a licensed Texas real estate broker, and now runs Joe Adame & Associates, a commercial real estate brokerage.

He has served as a past member on the Texas Real Estate Advisory Board at Texas A&M University – College Station, then chairman from 1997–2006.

Sources
 (election website, "About Joe" section)
 (Joe Adame & Associates)
 (lists Joseph A. Adame in Advisory Committee)
 (local newspaper article confirming some of these details)

Mayors of Corpus Christi, Texas
Living people
1945 births